Michel Moran (Paris, June 5, 1965) is a French restaurateur and master chef of Spanish origin. Juror of the Polish edition of MasterChef and MasterChef Junior broadcast on TVN. He lives in Poland permanently.

He is Andalusian by origin (son of Spanish emigrants). He studied at the hotel industry school Jean Drouant. He completed his apprenticeship, among others at the 5-star Royal Monceau Hotel. Since 2004, he has been the owner and chef of the Bistro de Paris restaurant, located in the building of the Warsaw National Opera, which received recommendations from Michelin in 2012. In 2013, he published his cookbook, widely reviewed on internet portals. In 2006, he was awarded the French Order of Agricultural Merit, awarded by the Minister of Agriculture, Dominique Bussereau, for promoting national agricultural products and fish and seafood.

Publications
 Moje smaki, Wydawnictwo MUZA S.A., 2013,

References

 

French restaurateurs
Living people
1965 births
French people of Spanish descent
French expatriates in Poland
Recipients of the Order of Agricultural Merit
French cookbook writers
Chefs from Paris